Willits may refer to:

Places
Willits, California
Willits Depot located in Willits, California
Willits High School also located in Willits, California
Willits Municipal Airport, also known as Ells Field, three miles northwest of Willits, California
Willits station, or Willits Depot, a historic train station in Willits, California
Willits House (The Ward W. Willits House), is a building designed by Frank Lloyd Wright
Levi Willits House, a historic house located in New Boston, Illinois

People
Given name
Willits J. Hole (1858–1936), American businessman and real estate developer 

Surname
Adam Willits (born 1972), Australian actor
Christopher Willits, musician and multimedia artist
Earl Willits (1946–1990), American politician and Iowa senator
Edwin Willits (1830–1896), American politician from Michigan
Emma Willits (1869–1965), American pioneering woman physician and surgeon
Joseph Willit, American investment banker
Ryan Willits (born 1987), Australian Rules footballer
Reggie Willits (born 1981), baseball player 
Scott Willits (1895–1973), American violin teacher who created a leading pedagogical method for teaching violin
Tim Willits, lead designer and co-owner of video game developer id Software
Wendi Willits Wells (born 1978), American girls basketball high school head coach

See also
Willetts, a surname